Amir Saipi (born 8 July 2000) is a Swiss professional footballer who plays as a goalkeeper for Swiss club Lugano.

Club career

Lugano
On 10 September 2021, Saipi signed a five-year contract with Swiss Super League club Lugano and receiving squad number 26. Two days later, he was named as a first team substitute for the first time in a league match against Basel. His debut with Lugano came five days later in the 2021–22 Swiss Cup second round against Neuchâtel Xamax after being named in the starting line-up. On 24 October 2021, he made his league debut in a 2–0 away defeat again against Basel after being named in the starting line-up.

International career
Saipi in 2019 was part of the Switzerland U20 with which he played four matches where most of them were friendly matches. On 26 August 2019, the Football Federation of Kosovo announced that they had held a meeting with Saipi and were very close to starting the procedures of equipping him with the necessary documents to be ready to join Kosovo in the October matches.

On 2 October 2020, Saipi received a call-up from Switzerland U21 for the 2021 UEFA European Under-21 Championship qualification matches against Georgia U21 and Liechtenstein U21. On 30 May 2021, he made his debut with Switzerland U21 in a friendly match against Republic of Ireland U21 after being named in the starting line-up.

Honours
Lugano
Swiss Cup: 2021–22

References

External links

2000 births
Living people
People from Schaffhausen
Sportspeople from the canton of Schaffhausen
Association football goalkeepers
Swiss men's footballers
Switzerland youth international footballers
Switzerland under-21 international footballers
Swiss people of Kosovan descent
Swiss people of Albanian descent
Kosovan footballers
2. Liga Interregional players
Swiss 1. Liga (football) players
FC Winterthur players
Grasshopper Club Zürich players
Swiss Challenge League players
FC Schaffhausen players
Swiss Super League players
FC Lugano players